Conchita Martínez was the defending champion but lost in the quarterfinals to Mary Pierce.

Irina Spîrlea won in the final 6–7, 6–4, 6–3 against Pierce.

Seeds
A champion seed is indicated in bold text while text in italics indicates the round in which that seed was eliminated. The top eight seeds received a bye to the second round.

  Conchita Martínez (quarterfinals)
  Arantxa Sánchez Vicario (semifinals)
  Magdalena Maleeva (second round)
  Chanda Rubin (third round)
 n/a
  Mary Joe Fernández (semifinals)
  Mary Pierce (final)
  Irina Spîrlea (champion)
 n/a
  Åsa Carlsson (first round)
  Lindsay Lee (first round)
  Sabine Hack (quarterfinals)
  Meredith McGrath (quarterfinals)
  Silvia Farina (first round)
  Elena Makarova (second round)
  Ruxandra Dragomir (second round)

Draw

Finals

Top half

Section 1

Section 2

Bottom half

Section 3

Section 4

External links
 ITF tournament edition details

Amelia Island Championships
1996 WTA Tour